Gaston Cyprès (19 November 1884 – 17 August 1925) was a French international football player. At club level he played as midfielder in CA Paris. He participated as striker in the inaugurational match of the France national team against Belgium on 1 May 1904. He was also one of the first three French to score a goal in the tricolour jersey (white at that time), with his equalizer in the 87th minute (3–3), thereby also setting the end score of the international friendly. In his six selections with Les Bleus, he scored twice (in France's first two matches). In 1908 during the only match he played with a French team at the Summer Olympics, he and his team suffered a 1–17 defeat against Denmark.

References

External links
 
 

1884 births
1925 deaths
French footballers
Sportspeople from Maine-et-Loire
CA Paris-Charenton players
Olympic footballers of France
Footballers at the 1908 Summer Olympics
France international footballers
Association football forwards
Footballers from Pays de la Loire